Søren Marinus Jensen (5 May 1879 – 6 January 1965) was a Danish sport wrestler who competed in the 1906 Intercalated Games and the 1908 and 1912 Summer Olympics. He won medals at each Game; however, the gold medals he won at the 1906 Games are no longer considered to be Olympic medals. He remains Denmark's most successful wrestler at the Olympics. In addition, he was World Champion in 1905 and won multiple European championship silver medals.

Sporting career
Jensen first competed at the 1904 World Wrestling Championships, failing to finish in the top three of his weight category. Returning the following year, he was victorious in the heavyweight competition, taking the gold medal. It was the only occasion he won the world championship, although he did place third in 1910. He also placed second in the European championships on three occasions.

Olympics
He competed for Denmark at the 1906 Intercalated Games, in the Greco-Roman heavyweight class and in an open weight class for all Greco-Roman competitors. In the very first round of the heavyweight class he faced the Austrian wrestler Arnold, who he considered to be his greatest threat in the competition. After an hour of wrestling, Jensen emerged victorious.

In the second round he faced Ronti, of the German team who weighed in excess of 120 kilograms (264 lbs). Following a victory against the German, he faced and defeated the Belgian Debouis and then Bauer from Austria in order to win the gold medal in the heavyweight class, at which point King George I of Greece called out to him in congratulation. Following that gold medal, he competed once more in the open competition, winning that competition as well and a second gold medal.

He competed at the following two Olympic Games, winning the bronze medal in the Greco-Roman super heavyweight event at the 1908 Summer Olympics and another bronze medal this time in the Greco-Roman heavyweight competition at the 1912 Summer Olympics. At the 1912 Games he actually made it to the deciding match to find out who would win the gold medal, against Finland's Yrjö Saarela. After three hours of wrestling in the open air, Jensen retired from exhaustion on a particularly hot day.

Legacy
Although he won Denmark's only wrestling gold medal at an Olympic Games, those Games are no longer considered to be a true Olympic Games and instead is referred to as the 1906 Intercalated Games. Including those medals at the 1906 Games, Jensen remains Denmark's most successful wrestler at the Olympics with his four medals.

References
General
 

Specific

External links
 

1879 births
1965 deaths
Olympic wrestlers of Denmark
Wrestlers at the 1906 Intercalated Games
Wrestlers at the 1908 Summer Olympics
Wrestlers at the 1912 Summer Olympics
Danish male sport wrestlers
Olympic gold medalists for Denmark
Olympic bronze medalists for Denmark
Olympic medalists in wrestling
Medalists at the 1908 Summer Olympics
Medalists at the 1912 Summer Olympics
Sportspeople from Aarhus
Medalists at the 1906 Intercalated Games